Kashia Airport  is an airstrip serving the city of Luputa in Lomami Province, Democratic Republic of the Congo.

See also

Transport in the Democratic Republic of the Congo
List of airports in the Democratic Republic of the Congo

References

External links
 Kashia
 HERE Maps - Kashia
 OpenStreetMap - Kashia
 OurAirports - Kashia
 

Airports in Lomami